Feliciana is an unincorporated community in Graves County, Kentucky, on Kentucky Route 94.

Settled in the early 1820s, Feliciana is served by a post office established in 1829.

Notable people 
 Lou Singletary Bedford (1837–?), author, poet, editor

References

Further reading

 J.A. Anderson, "Feliciana — Town That Didn't Want the Railroad," Paducah Evening Sun, October 27, 1924, page 6

 "Greetings From Allan M. Trout," The Courier-Journal, Louisville, Kentucky, page 29

Unincorporated communities in Graves County, Kentucky
Unincorporated communities in Kentucky